Machinjioni is an administrative ward in Kigoma-Ujiji District of Kigoma Region in Tanzania. 
In 2016 the Tanzania National Bureau of Statistics report there were 3,814 people in the ward, from 3,465 in 2012.

Villages / neighborhoods 
The ward has 4 neighborhoods.
 Kiruga
 Kitenge
 Ukumbi
 Wakuha

References

Wards of Kigoma Region